Pilar Tony Khoury (born 25 August 1994) is a footballer who plays as a forward for French Division 2 Féminine club Nantes and the Lebanon national team.

Khoury played at the college level for the Ottawa Gee-Gees, the University of Ottawa's team; she left in 2016 as their all-time goal scorer with 58 goals. Khoury moved to France the same year, where she joined Albi in the Division 1 Féminine; she then played for Division 2 sides Grenoble, Saint-Étienne and Nantes.

Born in Canada, Khoury is of Lebanese descent and has represented Lebanon internationally since 2021. She helped Lebanon finish runners-up at the 2022 WAFF Women's Championship, in which she scored her first international goal.

Early life 
Khoury was born in Canada to Lebanese parents. She noted that she was surrounded by Lebanese people and culture growing up, due to the large presence of Lebanese diaspora in her area.

Club career

Youth and college 
At 10 years old, Khoury began her youth career at local club Ottawa Gloucester Hornets, where she remained for seven years. She began as a defender, before being moved up to forward in her last year at the club.

Khoury then moved to the University of Ottawa's team, the Ottawa Gee-Gees. She made her breakthrough in her third season at the club, breaking the university’s scoring record twice and winning multiple individual titles. Khoury finished her career with the Ottawa Gee-Gees as their all-time leading goal scorer, with 58 goals.

Albi 
Khoury began her senior career in 2016, moving to Division 1 Féminine side Albi in France on 1 August. After being a reserve for the first half of the 2016–17 season, she became a regular in the second half and helped her side avoid relegation. Her second season saw Khoury miss multiple matches due to injuries, and the club was relegated to the Division 2 Féminine.

Grenoble 
She moved to Grenoble for the 2018–19 season in the Division 2. After a slow start, scoring once in the first half of the season, Khoury scored 10 goals in her next 10 games. She also scored three goals in four Coupe de France féminine games.

Saint-Étienne 
In 2019, Khoury joined Division 2 runners-up Saint-Étienne where, in the 2019–20 season, she scored six league goals in 11 matches. She also scored a goal in her only Coupe de France appearance. In 2020–21, Khoury scored four goals in four games, before the season was cancelled due to the COVID-19 pandemic in France. She finished with 11 goals in 18 games in all competitions.

Nantes 
On 27 July 2021, Khoury moved to Nantes. She made her debut on 5 September, in a 3–0 win against Lens. On 10 October, Khoury scored her first goal for Nantes, helping her team win 3–0 against Orléans. She ended the 2021–22 season with six goals in 20 league games, missing out on Division 1 promotion by one point. Khoury also scored one goal in five Coupe de France games, helping her side reach the semi-finals.

International career 
Born in Canada, Khoury is of Lebanese descent. She has stated her preference to play for Lebanon over Canada, saying that she dreamed of representing Lebanon from a young age.

Khoury was first called up for Lebanon in April 2021, ahead of a friendly tournament in Armenia. Regarding her first call-up, she stated: "I have difficulty expressing how much it means to me. To represent my parents' country after all the sacrifices they made for my soccer career". However, due to resulting positive to COVID-19, she was unable to travel.

She made her debut on 21 October, helping Lebanon beat the United Arab Emirates 1–0 in the 2022 AFC Women's Asian Cup qualification. Khoury was called up to represent Lebanon at the 2022 WAFF Women's Championship; she helped her side finish runners-up, scoring her first international goal against Syria on 4 September.

Style of play 
Initially a striker, Khoury developed into a winger during her stay at Nantes.

Personal life 
Khoury's maternal grandfather, Louis Saad, was also a footballer; he died in 2013. Khoury stated that he taught her how to play football. A few days prior to dying, her grandfather passed his French citizenship onto her, which facilitated her move to play professionally in France three years later.

While playing for the Ottawa Gee-Gees, Khoury completed a bachelor’s degree in health sciences with a minor in psychology. Khoury was also a student during her time at Albi.

Career statistics

Club

International 

Scores and results list Lebanon's goal tally first, score column indicates score after each Khoury goal.

Honours 
Lebanon
 WAFF Women's Championship runner-up: 2022

Individual
 OUA Player of the Year: 2014–15, 2015–16
 OUA First Team All-Star: 2013–14, 2014–15, 2015–16
 U SPORTS First Team All-Canadian: 2014–15, 2015–16

Records
 Ottawa Gee-Gees all-time goal scorer: 58 goals

See also
 List of Lebanon women's international footballers

References

External links

 

1994 births
Living people
Sportspeople from Ontario
Soccer players from Ottawa
Lebanese women's footballers
Canadian women's soccer players
Canadian people of Lebanese descent
Sportspeople of Lebanese descent
Naturalized citizens of France
Women's association football forwards
Ottawa Gee-Gees women's soccer players
ASPTT Albi players
Grenoble Foot 38 (women) players
AS Saint-Étienne (women) players
FC Nantes (women) players
Division 1 Féminine players
Division 2 Féminine players
Lebanon women's international footballers
Lebanese expatriate women's footballers
Lebanese expatriate sportspeople in France
Canadian expatriate women's soccer players
Canadian expatriate sportspeople in France
Expatriate women's footballers in France